Marea alta is a Mexican thriller streaming television series created by Katia Priwieziencew, Korek Bojanowski, and Antón Goenechea, and is produced by El Estudio. The series follows the disappearance of a teenager and the alterations on everyone's lives after threatening messages from her social media accounts disturbs their quiet community.

It premiered on Vix+ on 9 September 2022.

Cast

Main 
 Cassandra Ciangherotti as Maya
 Raúl Méndez as Robert
 Antonio López Torres as Samuel
 Giovanna Utrilla as Pau
 Matías Gruener Zabaleta as Greg
 Alejandro Porter as David
 Alejandro Flores as Beto
 Jesica Vite as Mia

Recurring 
 Fermín Martínez as Felipe Wong
 Gustavo Sánchez as Enrique
 Susana Zabaleta as Hortensia
 Eber Segobia as Murguía
 Diana Lein as Gloria
 Gustavo Sánchez Parra as Enrique
 Rod Zapién as Luis
 Irving del Real as Iván
 Leidi Gutiérrez as Cruz
 Paden Koltiska as Jonah
 Mahoali Nassourou as Nina
 Maru Kazán as Sonia
 Adolfo Madera as Diego
 Ángeles Cruz as Eugenia
 Helena Rodríguez as Itzel
 Jessy Flores as Mari
 Alex F. Hugo as Javier
 Gerardo Lechuga as Ricky

Production 
On 16 February 2022, the series was announced as one of the titles for TelevisaUnivision's streaming platform Vix+. Filming of the series began on 29 March 2022 in Tijuana and on the beaches of Ensenada, Baja California. On 31 August 2022, Vix released the first official trailer for the series.

Episodes

References

External links 
 

2020s Mexican television series
2022 Mexican television series debuts
Spanish-language television shows
Vix (streaming service) original programming